Playlist: The Very Best of Yanni is a compilation album by keyboardist and composer Yanni, released on the Windham Hill label in 2013. This compilation is a remastered recordings.

Track listing

AllMusic review
Windham Hill's Playlist: The Very Best of Yanni collects 14 tracks from the new age keyboardist's long discography. While it may not be the most thorough Yanni compilation, and a few of his big singles are left off the track listing, it's a solid, 75-minute overview that should satisfy the needs of most. Highlights include the hit singles "A Love for Life", "Aria", and "Chasing Shadows.

References

External links
Official Website

Yanni albums
2013 compilation albums